The Andrew Neil Show is a political programme presented by Andrew Neil. It is broadcast on Channel 4 every Sunday evening. It was launched on 8 May 2022, returned for a second series on 25 September 2022, and returned for a third series on 29 January 2023.

Background
Neil's BBC political programme The Andrew Neil Show came off-air during the COVID-19 pandemic on 11 March 2020 and was then cancelled as a result of budget cuts at the BBC. Following his departure from the BBC, Neil became founding chairman of GB News and a presenter on the channel, but resigned amid controversy in September 2021.

In January 2022, it was reported that Neil was in talks with Channel 4 about presenting a weekly politics show to be launched later in 2022. On 21 February, Channel 4 announced that Neil would host a show beginning in May, which would also be accompanied by a weekly podcast.

Format
The Andrew Neil Show airs at 6 pm on Sundays. The show was extended to 45 minutes on 25 September 2022, and George Osborne and Ed Balls became regular commentators.

Episodes

Series 1

Series 2

Series 3

Reception
The Telegraph said of the inaugural episode: "It made for a middling half hour of chat, chuckles and cheeky jokes."

References

External links

2022 British television series debuts
2020s British political television series
Channel 4 original programming
British political television series
English-language television shows
Television series reboots